The Hainish Cycle consists of a number of science fiction novels and stories by Ursula K. Le Guin. It is set in a future history in which civilizations of human beings on planets orbiting a number of nearby stars, including Terra ("Earth"), are contacting each other for the first time and establishing diplomatic relations, and setting up a confederacy under the guidance of the oldest of the human worlds, peaceful Hain. In this history, human beings did not evolve on Earth but were the result of interstellar colonies planted by Hain long ago, which was followed by a long period when interstellar travel ceased. Some of the races have new genetic traits, a result of ancient Hainish experiments in genetic engineering, including people who can dream while awake, and a world of androgynous people who only come into active sexuality once a month, not knowing which sex will manifest in them. In keeping with Le Guin's style, she uses varied social and environmental settings to explore the anthropological and sociological outcomes of human evolution in those diverse environments.

The Hainish novels The Left Hand of Darkness (1969) and The Dispossessed (1974) have won literary awards, as have the novella The Word for World Is Forest (1972) and the short story "The Day Before the Revolution" (1974).

Le Guin herself often discounted the idea of a "Hainish Cycle", writing on her website that "The thing is, they aren't a cycle or a saga. They do not form a coherent history. There are some clear connections among them, yes, but also some extremely murky ones."

Sequence of writing versus story chronology
In the first three novels—Rocannon's World (1966), Planet of Exile (1966), and City of Illusions (1967)—there is a League of All Worlds. By City of Illusions, the League seems to have been conquered or fragmented by an alien race, the Shing, from beyond the League.

In the fourth, The Left Hand of Darkness (1969), it seems that the planets of the former League have reunited as the Ekumen, which was founded by the Hainish people.

In the fifth, The Word for World Is Forest (1972), the League of All Worlds and the ansible are new creations, and the term "Ekumen" is not used; it is set before any of the first four books. It was part of the anthology Again, Dangerous Visions, and only published as a separate book in 1976.

The sixth, The Dispossessed (1974), is the earliest novel chronologically in the Hainish Cycle. The Cetians have been visited by people from other planets, including Terra (Earth) and Hain. The various planets are separate, though there is some talk of a union. The idea of the ansible is known but none yet exists.

Later novels and short stories speak only of the Ekumen—which now includes the Gethenians, who were the subject of The Left Hand of Darkness—and not of the League.

Backstory
Hundreds of thousands of years ago, the people of Hain colonized a large number of worlds, including Earth, known as Terra. Most of these were similar enough that humans from one world can pass as natives of another, but on some the old Hainish 'colonisers' used genetic engineering. At least one of the various species of Rocannon's World are the product of genetic engineering, as are the "hilfs" ("highly intelligent life forms") of Planet S (whose story has not so far been told), and probably the androgynous humans of Gethen in The Left Hand of Darkness. The Ekumen do not know whether the colonisers sought to adapt humans to varied worlds, were conducting various experiments, or had other reasons.

Hainish civilization subsequently collapsed, and the colony planets (including Earth) forgot that other human worlds existed. The Ekumen stories tell of the efforts to re-establish a civilization on a galactic scale through NAFAL (Nearly As Fast As Light) interstellar travel taking years to travel between stars (although only weeks or months from the viewpoint of the traveler because of time dilation), and through instantaneous interstellar communication using the ansible.

This seems to have happened in two phases: First, the League of All Worlds was formed, as an alliance of planets, mostly descended from colonization efforts from the planet Hain, uniting the "nine known worlds" — presumably along with new colonies. By the time of Rocannon's World it has grown but is also under threat from a distant enemy. In City of Illusions it is recalled as having been a league of some 80 worlds at the time it was destroyed by aliens called the Shing, who are uniquely able to lie in mindspeech. After the apparent overthrow of the Shing by Terran descendants from Alterra / Werel (capable of recognizing the Shing lies), the alliance is eventually reconstructed.

A second phase begins with The Left Hand of Darkness. The 80 plus planets seem to have reunited as the Ekumen – a name derived from the Greek "oikoumene", meaning "the inhabited world", although characters occasionally refer to it as "the Household", which is in turn a reference to the Greek "oikos", a word which developed from the same root as "oikoumene". Unexplained references are made by the protagonist from Terra in the Left Hand of Darkness to a long-past "Age of the Enemy", which presumably refers to the time that the Shing controlled Terra, portrayed in City of Illusions.

Planets

The Ekumen (or the League of All Worlds, though that is also believed to be the previous planetary coalition, before some sort of galactic crisis) contains a very large number of planets and is continually exploring new ones. Genly Ai in The Left Hand of Darkness explains that there are 83 planets in the Ekumen, with Gethen a candidate for becoming the 84th. The process of reaching out to potential civilizations is a tedious and sometimes dangerous one.

Technology
Societies tend to use sophisticated but unobtrusive technologies.  Most notable is the ansible, an instant-communication device that keeps worlds in touch with each other.

Physical communication is by NAFAL (Nearly As Fast As Light) ships.  The physics is never explained; the ship vanishes from where it was and reappears somewhere else many years later. The trip takes slightly longer than it would to cross the same distance at the speed of light, but ship-time is just a few hours for those on board. It cannot be used for trips within a solar system. Trips can begin or end close to a planet, but if used without a "retemporalizer", there are drastic physical effects at the end of long trips, at least according to the Shing, whose information may be suspect.  It is also lethal if the traveler is pregnant.

City of Illusions mentions automatic death-machines that work on the same principle as the ansible and can strike instantly at distant worlds. Such a device is clearly used in the events of Rocannon's World. The weapons are not mentioned again in later books.

Churten theory, as developed by the physicists of Anarres, should allow people to go instantly from solar system to solar system. It is a development of the work of Shevek, whose tale is told in The Dispossessed.  Shevek's work made the ansible possible—it is mentioned in his tale that engineers decided they could build it once the correct theory was found. Churten theory offers a way to move people and spacecraft instantaneously, but there are side effects.  These are described in three short stories, "The Shobies' Story," "Dancing to Ganam", and "Another Story, or, A Fisherman of the Inland Sea," all collected in A Fisherman of the Inland Sea (1994).

The ansible has been adopted by other science fiction and fantasy authors, such as Orson Scott Card, Elizabeth Moon, and Vernor Vinge.

Post-technological worlds
The ideas of post-technological societies and social and ecological collapse are in several of the stories. These are portrayed as the end result of the wrong kind of civilizations, i.e., competitive, capitalist, patriarchal, "dynamic, aggressive, ecology-breaking cultures," while successful societies are close to the land, peaceful, non-authoritarian, non-competitive, static, communitarian, with the holistic outlook of Eastern religions.  The Earth, called "Terra" in the Cycle, is mentioned as one of the failed civilizations.
In City of Illusions, Earth has suffered some sort of collapse in a distant future, losing contact with the stars.
In The Dispossessed, the ecological disaster of Earth is described; it has become "a planet spoiled by the human species" through wars and runaway industrial development.  Pollution has turned it into a desert and ruined the carrying capacity of the land. The population has fallen from nine billion to half a billion, who only survive by rationing, labor conscription, euthanasia, forced birth control, and the charity of the Hainish. 
In "Another Story" in A Fisherman of the Inland Sea, it is mentioned that Earth still suffers badly from pollution.
Eleven-Soro had a high level of technology and then a massive crash, as is told in the short story "Solitude" in The Birthday of the World.
Hain itself has gone back to a simpler life, with high technology used only where it can be justified, as is told in the first part of "A Man of the People" in Four Ways to Forgiveness.  This also seems to apply to the planet Ve.
Orint and Kheakh are mentioned in passing as worlds that have totally destroyed themselves.
In The Left Hand Of Darkness, the planet Gde is described as extremely hot rock and desert, the result of a technological society that "wrecked its ecological balance" some millennia previous, and "burned up its forests for kindling."

Biology
Most of the people in the tales have a common descent from the planet Hain, whose people settled many worlds. Some of them are genetically similar enough to produce children together.  The unusual hairiness of the Cetians is mentioned in The Word for World Is Forest and The Dispossessed. The Telling includes the detail that the people of Chiffewar are all bald.

There are some cases of ancient biological manipulation:
Unique among known humans, the Hainish have complete voluntary control of their fertility. In order for a Hainish man and woman to reproduce, they must both consciously choose to produce viable genetic material, which they learn to do in adolescence. The required genetic changes to the Hainish population were made in the far distant past, and apparently took many generations to accomplish.
The Left Hand of Darkness mentions that the hilfs of S must have been produced by human genetic manipulation by the ancient Hainish people, along with the Gethenians and the degenerate winged hominoids of Rokanan. We hear no more about the hilfs of S, unless these are the same as the small furry natives of Athshe, who are also of Hainish descent.
The ambisexual humans of Gethen may have been produced as an adaptation to a harsh climate, or an experiment to see how people would live without gender.  Both ideas are mentioned and nothing is definitely settled.
The degenerate winged hominoids are seen in Rocannon's World. They live in cities that require much higher technology to build than the rest of the races on Rokanan, but live in bat-like societies, hunting for humans and animals on which their larvae feed by sucking their blood.
The Matter of Seggri tells us that the extreme gender imbalance of the people of Seggri may be another case of genetic manipulation.
 Alterrans have distinctive cat-like eyes. While normally unable to breed with Earth-humans, the latter become sufficiently genetically similar within a few centuries on their planet due to unspecified natural factors. This almost drives the Earth-descended colony to extinction due to the genetic differences between mothers and fetuses causing miscarriages. The Alterrans may be another case of genetic manipulation, or a similar natural adaptation themselves.
 The Shing of City of Illusions are not of Hainish origin and cannot interbreed with Earth-humans. They dismiss the report about the human adaptation on Alterra as impossible.

Hainish Cycle bibliography

Novels and short story collections

Short stories

References

Further reading

External links
  (Original link to this site is 403 Forbidden, 15.08.07)
  with Hainish chronology, plot summaries
 
 Eyes and Illusions in Tolkien and Le Guin.  Including an analysis of how background assumptions shift between stories.

 
Book series introduced in 1966
Novels set on fictional planets
Series by Ursula K. Le Guin
Science fiction book series
Social science fiction